Wennhak v Morgan is a leading case in English defamation law, that held that communication with one's own spouse will not be considered to be 'published' for the purposes of defamation cases.

In Wennhak, Huddleston B thought (with Manisty J. agreeing) that the question could be decided “on the common law principle that husband and wife are one”, and that accordingly there had been no publication.

“[T]he maxim and principle acted on for centuries is still in existence, viz, that as regards this case, husband and wife are in point of law one person.”

References

English defamation case law